Schizopodidae is a family of beetles, in the large suborder Polyphaga. It was a subfamily until 1991, when it was elevated to family status.

The family of Schizopodidae is a part of the superfamily, Buprestoidea, which is a member of the suborder of polyphaga beetles, defined by the coxa not being fused to the thorax. Buprestoidea contains bullet-shaped beetles, known for their distinctive metallic colors. Little is known about Schizopodidae, but the adults are often found clinging to plants.

The family contains the following genera:

 Dystaxia LeConte, 1866
 †Electrapate Iablokoff-Khnzorian, 1962 Baltic amber, Eocene
 Glyptoscelimorpha Horn, 1893
 †Mesoschizopus Cai et al., 2015 Yixian Formation, China, Early Cretaceous (Aptian)
 Schizopus LeConte, 1858

References

 
Beetle families